Saint Herman may refer to:

People
 Saint Herman of Valaam, 12th century, the founder of the Valaam Monastery in Karelia, together with Saint Sergius of Valaam
 Saint Herman of Alaska (1756? – 1836)
 Saint Hermann of Reichenau (1013–1064)
 Saint Herman Joseph of Cologne (1150–1243)

Other
 Saint Herman's Orthodox Theological Seminary in Kodiak, Alaska
 Saint Herman of Alaska Church in Espoo, Finland